Zhirnovskoye Urban Settlement is the name of several municipal formations in Russia.

Zhirnovskoye Urban Settlement, an administrative division and a municipal formation which the work settlement of Zhirnov and four rural localities in Tatsinsky District of Rostov Oblast are incorporated as
Zhirnovskoye Urban Settlement, a municipal formation which the town of district significance of Zhirnovsk in Zhirnovsky District of Volgograd Oblast is incorporated as

See also
Zhirnovsky (disambiguation)

References

Notes

Sources

